Jackowski (feminine: Jackowska, plural: Jackowscy) is a Polish surname. It may refer to:

 Aleksander Jackowski (1920–2017), Polish anthropologist
 Bill Jackowski (1914–1996), American baseball umpire
 Jan Maria Jackowski (born 1958), Polish politician
 Maksymilian Jackowski (1815–1905), Polish activist
 Marek Jackowski (1946–2013), Polish musician
 Olga Jackowska (1951–2018), Polish singer
 Stanisław Jackowski (1887–1951), Polish sculptor
 Stanisław Jackowski (officer) (1881–1929), Polish Army officer

See also
 

Polish-language surnames